Louisa Johnson (born 1998), is a singer who won The X Factor in 2015.

Louisa Johnson is also the name of:
Louisa Adams (née Johnson; 1775–1852), First Lady of the United States from 1825 to 1829

See also
Louise Johnson (1940–2012), British biochemist and protein crystallographer
Louise Johnson (blues) - Blues singer and pianist.